Anthony Paul Jackson (16 July 1938 – 18 August 2003) was a British musician. He was known for being a member of the Merseybeat band   The Searchers.

Biography
Jackson was born in Dingle, Liverpool, Lancashire. After leaving school he went to Walton Technical College to train as an electrician. Jackson was inspired by the skiffle sound of Lonnie Donegan, and then by Buddy Holly and other U.S. rock and rollers. He founded the skiffle group the Martinis.

Nicknamed Black Jake, he joined the guitar duo the Searchers, which had been formed by John McNally and Mike Pender in 1959. The band soon expanded further to a quartet with the addition of the drummer Chris Curtis. Jackson built and learned to play a customised bass guitar. Learning his new job on the four-stringed instrument proved too difficult to permit him to continue singing lead so he made way for a new singer, Johnny Sandon, in 1960. They played in Liverpool's nightclubs and the beer bars of Hamburg, Germany. Brian Epstein considered signing them but he lost interest after seeing a drunken Jackson fall off the stage at the Cavern Club. Sandon moved on in February 1962 and the band were signed by Pye Records in mid-1963 when the Beatles' success created demand for Liverpudlian acts.

Jackson was lead singer and played bass on the band's first two the United Kingdom hits, "Sweets for My Sweet" and "Sugar and Spice", but was not the vocalist on the band's biggest hit "Needles and Pins". He was featured on both "Don't Throw Your Love Away" and "Love Potion No. 9".

In 1964 the band toured the United States, including an appearance on The Ed Sullivan Show. Jackson was unhappy with the band's move away from rock and roll to a softer, more melodic sound and felt that he was not getting appropriate attention. He left the group in July 1964 in some acrimony and immediately moved to London and put together a new band, the Vibrations, which had an organ-based sound instead of the Searchers' guitar based one.

After leaving the Searchers Jackson spent £200 on cosmetic surgery on his nose. He said at the time that he had had a lifelong complex about his nose to the extent that he could not mix socially. The surgery had followed psychiatric treatment. That same year he revealed that his 1960 marriage to Margaret Parry had been effectively over for two years.

The Vibrations toured the UK with the Hollies, Marianne Faithfull and other acts. They released four singles on the Pye Records label but only the first had any success. In 1965 they changed their name to the Tony Jackson Group but the fourth single also failed and Pye dropped them. The band then signed to CBS without improvement and they found that there were few bookings in the UK so they toured southern Europe until even that withered. Disillusioned and out of options, Jackson left the music business.

Jackson took a variety of jobs including Spanish night club manager, entertainments representative, furniture salesman, disc jockey and golf club manager. In the 1980s he tried to establish a Searchers revival band, but was unable to compete effectively with the other two that already existed.

In 1991, Tony Jackson and the Vibrations reformed and an album of Jackson's material after the Searchers was released. The resuscitation of his career was short-lived, however, although he did appear four times with Mike Pender's Searchers between 1992 and 1995. That ended in 1996 when he was convicted of threatening a woman with an air pistol after an argument over a phone booth, and sentenced to 18 months imprisonment.

The arthritis in his hands became so bad that he had to abandon even recreational guitar playing. In 2002 he said, "The spirit's willing, but the body's knackered."

Death 
Towards the end of his life he suffered from diabetes, heart disease and cirrhosis of the liver from a lifetime of heavy alcohol consumption. Jackson died on 18 August 2003 in a Nottingham hospital, he was 65.

References

 'Paul Francis, Drummer of the Vibrations, story of being on the road and in the studio with Tony Jackson and the Vibrations'
Associated Press, 'Tony Jackson, Bass Player of the Searchers', (22 August 2003) Retrieved 22 May 2005
 Retrieved 22 May 2005
Allen, Frank. 'Tony Jackson', jacobsladder.org.uk (August 2003) Retrieved 22 May 2005
Eder, Bruce. Allmusic
'Obituary: Tony Jackson', Daily Telegraph (20 August 2003)

External links
The Searchers' History
The Searchers' Records including TJ solo releases

1938 births
2003 deaths
English male guitarists
Male bass guitarists
English male singers
English songwriters
Musicians from Liverpool
20th-century English singers
English rock bass guitarists
English rock singers
Alcohol-related deaths in England
Deaths from cirrhosis
20th-century English bass guitarists
20th-century British male singers
The Searchers (band) members
British male songwriters